An uchastok (plural ), or dilyanka in Ukrainian usage (plural ), was a territorial-administrative unit of the Russian Empire and early Russian SFSR. Throughout most of modern Russian history, uchastoks, which numbered 2,523 throughout the empire by 1914, were a third-level administrative division, below okrugs, uyezds and otdels (counties). In a literal sense, uchastok approximately corresponds to the English term plot, however, in practical usage it corresponds to a sub-county, section or municipal district.

History 
In 1708, an administrative reform carried out by Tsar Peter the Great divided Russia into guberniyas (provinces) with subordinate uezds, whereas oblasts (regions) consisted of okrugs (counties), or otdels (Cossack counties), however, the counties of all were usually divided into either uchastoks or volosts, with the exception of the uezds of the Black Sea Governorate which did not have any sub-counties.

By the Soviet administrative reform of 1923–1929, most of the uchastoks were transformed into raions (districts), which corresponded in a similar land size, however, were subordinate directly to its Soviet republic rather than to any larger province or county.

Administration 
Uchastoks were coterminous with police districts—which were in the charge of the local police chief. A selskoye obshchestvo, literally translating to "rural community" were often the subdivisions of uchastoks, if not their equivalent, consisting of groups of geographically linked villages. A magal is a similar sub-county which was less-commonly used but still equivalent to an uchastok, however, a stanitsa—which was common in otdels—was always subordinate to an uchastok.

The equivalent of an uchastok in the Dagestan Oblast was a nai-bate, which was ruled by a naib or local leader, who was a military deputy appointed by higher authorities (analogous to a pristav, or military commandant)

See also 

 History of the administrative division of Russia
 Viceroyalty
 Guberniya
 Oblast
 Okrug
 Uezd
 Volost

References

External links 

  "Administrative territorial division of Russia in the 18th-20th centuries" («Административно-территориальное деление России XVIII—XX веков») "Otechestvennye Zapiski", No.6, 2002.
  Тархов, Сергей, "Изменение административно-территориального деления России в XIII-XX в." (pdf), Логос, #1 2005 (46), 

Subdivisions of the Russian Empire
Local government in the Russian Empire
Types of administrative division
Russian-language designations of territorial entities
1921 disestablishments in Russia
Rural communities of the Russian Empire